André Luiz Pessanha Cordeiro (born August 9, 1967) is a water polo goalkeeper from Brazil. Nicknamed Pará, he competed in three consecutive Pan American Games for his native country, starting in 1999. Cordeiro won two silver medals at this event with the Brazil men's national water polo team. In the South American Games, "Pará", won five consecutive gold medals with Brazil Squad in the years of 1998,2000,2002,2004 and 2006.

References
  Profile

1967 births
Living people
Brazilian male water polo players
Water polo players from Rio de Janeiro (city)
Pan American Games silver medalists for Brazil
Pan American Games medalists in water polo
Water polo players at the 2003 Pan American Games
Water polo players at the 2007 Pan American Games
South American Games gold medalists for Brazil
Medalists at the 2003 Pan American Games
Medalists at the 2007 Pan American Games
21st-century Brazilian people